Marco Guidone (born 17 May 1986) is an Italian football forward who plays for Ravenna.

Club career
Guidone has previously played for Monza, Catanzaro, Melfi, Sansovino, as well as Royal Cercle Sportif Verviétois, Belgium and known as ‘Le Luca Toni verviétois’.
He was successively signed by Carrarese in August 2009 as a free agent. He left Carrarese in August 2010 and joined Grosseto, Serie B. At the end of January 2011 moved to Pisa on loan. In August 2011 joined Foligno on loan. In September 2012 he signed for Fondi. In August 2013 he left Fondi for Chieti. In July 2014 he signed for Santarcangelo. After two year with Santarcangelo, Guidone signed for Reggiana for free. In August 2017 he left Reggiana and was signed by Padova. 

On 17 January 2019, he joined Vis Pesaro on loan.

On 8 August 2019, he signed a two-year contract with Siena.

On 22 July 2021, he joined Ravenna in Serie D.

References

External links
 
 

1986 births
Living people
Sportspeople from Monza
Italian footballers
Association football forwards
A.C. Monza players
U.S. Catanzaro 1929 players
A.S. Melfi players
A.C. Sansovino players
R.C.S. Verviétois players
Carrarese Calcio players
F.C. Grosseto S.S.D. players
Pisa S.C. players
A.S.D. Città di Foligno 1928 players
S.S. Racing Club Fondi players
S.S. Chieti Calcio players
Santarcangelo Calcio players
A.C. Reggiana 1919 players
Calcio Padova players
A.C.N. Siena 1904 players
Ravenna F.C. players
Serie B players
Serie C players
Serie D players
Belgian Third Division players
Italian expatriate footballers
Expatriate footballers in Belgium
Italian expatriate sportspeople in Belgium
Footballers from Lombardy